FirstEnergy Stadium is a stadium in Cleveland, Ohio, United States, primarily for American football. It is the home field of the Cleveland Browns of the National Football League (NFL), and serves as a venue for other events such as college and high school football, soccer, hockey, and concerts. It opened in 1999 as Cleveland Browns Stadium and was renovated in two phases in early 2014 and 2015. The initial seating capacity was listed at 73,200 people, but following the first phase of the renovation project in 2014, was reduced to the current capacity of 67,431. Cleveland Stadium stood on the site from 1931 to 1996.

History

FirstEnergy Stadium is located on the site of Cleveland Stadium, commonly called Cleveland Municipal Stadium, a multipurpose facility built in 1931 that served as the Browns' home field from their inception in 1946 through the 1995 season. During the 1995 season, owner Art Modell announced his plans to move the team to Baltimore, which resulted in legal action from the city of Cleveland and Browns season ticket holders. The day after the announcement was made, voters in Cuyahoga County approved an extension of the original 1990 sin tax on alcohol and tobacco products to fund renovations to Cleveland Stadium. Eventually, as part of the agreement between Modell, the city of Cleveland, and the NFL, the city agreed to tear down Cleveland Stadium and build a new stadium on the same site using the sin tax funds. Modell agreed to leave the Browns name, colors, and history in Cleveland and create a new identity for his franchise, eventually becoming the Baltimore Ravens, while the NFL agreed to reactivate the Browns by 1999 through expansion or relocation of another team. Demolition on the old stadium began in November 1996 and was completed in early 1997. Debris from the former stadium was submerged in Lake Erie and now serves as an artificial reef.

Ground was broken for the new stadium on May 15, 1997, and it opened in July 1999. The first event was a preseason game between the Browns and the Minnesota Vikings on August 21, followed the next week by a preseason game against the Chicago Bears. The first regular-season Browns game at the stadium was played the evening of September 12, 1999, a 43–0 loss to the Pittsburgh Steelers.

Since 2011, the stadium has been referred to by some as the "Factory of Sadness", a name that was first coined that year by comedian and Browns fan Mike Polk. Polk made a video outside the stadium in which he complains about the team's futility. In 2021, after the Browns defeated the Steelers at Heinz Field, local TV station WKYC broadcast a segment with Polk where he "closed" the Factory of Sadness.

Through the 2020 season, FirstEnergy Stadium and Allegiant Stadium are the only NFL venues that have yet to host a postseason game of any kind. The Browns are one of six teams who have yet to host a home playoff game in their respective stadium, along with the Atlanta Falcons, Detroit Lions, Las Vegas Raiders, Los Angeles Chargers, and New York Jets. These teams (save for the Raiders), however, have hosted the Super Bowl at their respective stadiums, while the Jets' home, MetLife Stadium, has also hosted a New York Giants home playoff game.

Facility

The stadium was designed by Populous, which was known at the time as the Sport Venue Event Division of Hellmuth, Obata & Kassabaum (HOK). Indianapolis-based Huber, Hunt & Nichols was the construction manager. The stadium is a concrete and glass structure, using precast concrete and cast in-place for the upper concourse. Natural stone accents were used at the base of the stadium.

The heating system prevents the field from freezing and extends the growing season of the turf. Although it was designed for football, the playing surface was built large enough to accommodate international soccer matches.

The eastern seating section is the home of the Dawg Pound, a section of bleacher seats. It was designed as a successor to the original Dawg Pound at Cleveland Stadium, the bleacher section also located in the east end zone. When FirstEnergy Stadium opened in 1999, the Dawg Pound was a 10,644, double-deck area. During stadium renovations in 2014, the upper level of the Dawg Pound was reduced to make way for a new, larger scoreboard, auxiliary scoreboard, and additional fan areas, and the bleacher seating in the upper level was replaced with chairbacks.

Renovations
In 2013, Browns owner Jimmy Haslam announced a modernization project for FirstEnergy Stadium. The project included two phases that took place during the NFL offseasons in 2014 and 2015. Phase one included improving the audio system, installing new scoreboards three times the size of the original scoreboards and at the time the fourth largest in an NFL stadium, as well as adding more seats to the lower bowl. Phase two included concession improvements, upgrades to technology connectivity, graphics throughout the stadium, and enhancing the premium suites. The renovations reduced the stadium's capacity to approximately 68,000. The total cost of the renovations was estimated at $120 million with the city of Cleveland paying $30 million over 15 years and the Browns covering the rest of the cost.

Stadium naming
The city specifically chose not to sell the naming rights to the stadium itself, which is highly unusual for major American stadiums built in recent years. However, it instead sold the naming rights to each of the facility's four main entrance gates. Originally, the gates were named for National City Bank, Steris Corp., CoreComm Inc., and the Cleveland Clinic Sports Health. The arrangement was later discontinued, though has since been partially restored. As of the 2018 season, the southwest gate is not sponsored, while the southeast gate is sponsored by and named for University Hospitals of Cleveland, the northeast gate by Cree Inc., and the northwest gate by Fifth Third Bank. The stadium is sometimes referred to as the "Factory of Sadness," due to the Browns' recent period of futility.

Randy Lerner sold the Browns to Jimmy Haslam, CEO of truck stop chain Pilot Flying J, in August 2012. Before the deal officially closed in October 2012, Haslam announced he would sell the stadium's naming rights. Haslam effectively ruled out his family business as buying the naming rights, mentioning that he had received offers for the naming rights, and that none of them are based in his home state of Tennessee. On January 14, 2013, it was reported that the naming rights were sold to FirstEnergy Corporation, the Akron-based electric utility serving most of northeastern Ohio. The Browns announced the following day that the stadium would be renamed "FirstEnergy Stadium, Home of the Cleveland Browns", with the deal getting official Cleveland City Council approval on February 15, 2013. Though naming rights belong to FirstEnergy Corporation through 2029, the stadium itself is actually serviced by Cleveland Public Power.

Because of the Ohio nuclear bribery scandal and FirstEnergy's involvement in it, Cleveland City Council passed a resolution in June 2022 to urge FirstEnergy to relinquish its naming rights. Neither the Browns nor FirstEnergy, however, elected to end the agreement.

Services
The stadium does not have public parking facilities. However, there are several adjacent parking facilities: the Port Authority visitors lot, the West 3rd Street parking lot, and the Great Lakes Science Center parking garage. Additionally, the West 3rd Street station of Cleveland's Waterfront light rail line serves the stadium.

Other events

In addition to home games for the Browns, the stadium hosts other events during the year, including college football, high school football, and international soccer, along with occasional concerts. The Ohio Classic, a college football game, was held there in both 2004 and 2005. In September 2006, it hosted the game between the Bowling Green Falcons and Wisconsin Badgers, which had an announced attendance of 30,307 people. From 2007 through 2009, the stadium hosted an event known as the Patriot Bowl, a season-opening game intended to showcase teams from the Mid-American Conference. The first Patriot Bowl featured the Army Black Knights and Akron Zips and drew 17,835 fans. The following season, Boston College defeated Kent State in the second Patriot Bowl on August 30, 2008 in front of 10,788 people. The third and final Patriot Bowl game was between the Ohio State Buckeyes and Toledo Rockets. While the game was considered a home game for Toledo, the crowd of 71,727 was mostly Ohio State fans.

It has hosted numerous high school football games, including playoff games of the Ohio High School Athletic Association (OHSAA) tournament. In June 2010, the Browns announced that four area powerhouses would play in doubleheader named the High School Football Charity Game. The games were played on August 28, 2010. Most recently it hosted the rivalry game between two of the Cleveland area's largest parochial schools, St. Ignatius High School and St. Edward High School, in October 2016, which had 17,400 fans in attendance.

The stadium is the setting for Progressive Corporation's At Home campaign showing Browns quarterback Baker Mayfield living with his wife in the facility.

The stadium is also host to Monster Jam, which made its debut on July 2, 2022. Another one will take place on June 3, 2023.

Soccer
FirstEnergy Stadium is a periodic host for both the United States men's (USMNT) and women's national soccer (USWNT) teams. The stadium hosted a match between the USMNT and Venezuela in the run-up to the 2006 FIFA World Cup, a 2–0 victory for the Yanks, and a 2–4 loss in 2013 against Belgium that drew 27,720 fans. The USWNT has played at the stadium on three occasions, with the most recent being in 2018. It hosted a 4–0 friendly victory against Germany in 2010 and the second leg of a friendly series with Japan in 2016, a 2–0 win for the USWNT. The game against Japan had 23,535 fans in attendance, the largest crowd to see the USWNT play in Ohio. The USWNT returned on June 12, 2018, in a game against China, won by the U.S. 2–1. CONCACAF announced in December 2016 that FirstEnergy Stadium would host games in the group stage of the 2017 CONCACAF Gold Cup, with the USMNT playing at the stadium July 15, 2017 against Nicaragua as part of a doubleheader that also included Panama and Martinique. Both Panama and the United States won their respective matches by a score of 3–0. FirstEnergy Stadium again hosted group stage play during the 2019 CONCACAF Gold Cup, with Panama defeating Guyana 4–2 and the USMNT winning 6–0 over Trinidad and Tobago.

Concerts
A limited number of concerts have been held at FirstEnergy Stadium since it opened. The first concert held in the stadium was George Strait in 2000, followed in 2001 by NSYNC, as part of their PopOdyssey Tour, and The Three Tenors. Kenny Chesney has performed at the stadium on three occasions. His Flip-Flop Summer Tour came to Cleveland in 2007, followed by The Poets and Pirates Tour in 2008, and the Brothers of the Sun Tour in 2012. In 2015, the stadium was part of the circuits for One Direction and their On the Road Again Tour as well as Luke Bryan and his Kick the Dust Up Tour. U2 performed at FirstEnergy Stadium July 1, 2017 as part of The Joshua Tree Tour 2017. Tickets for the concert went on sale January 17 and were sold out the following day. Concerts held at the stadium in 2018 included Taylor Swift in Taylor Swift's Reputation Stadium Tour on July 17, followed by Beyoncé and Jay-Z on July 25 as part of their On the Run II Tour. On July 14, 2022, Def Leppard and Mötley Crüe continued their The Stadium Tour at the stadium to a sold-out crowd.

Hockey
It was announced August 22, 2022, that the stadium would host their first outdoor hockey game, a college ice hockey game between Michigan and Ohio State, titled Faceoff on the Lake. The game was held on February 18, 2023, where Ohio State defeated Michigan 4–2.

Later in 2022, on October 11, it was announced that on March 4, 2023, the stadium would host an American Hockey League game between the Cleveland Monsters and the Wilkes-Barre/Scranton Penguins, titled the Cleveland Monsters Outdoor Classic.

See also
 Chronology of home stadiums for current National Football League teams
 List of American football stadiums by capacity
 List of U.S. stadiums by capacity
 List of North American stadiums by capacity

References

External links

 
FirstEnergy Stadium at StadiumDB.com

American football venues in Ohio
Cleveland Browns stadiums
National Football League venues
Sports venues in Cleveland
Sports venues completed in 1999
FirstEnergy
Music venues in Cleveland
Soccer venues in Ohio
1999 establishments in Ohio
CONCACAF Gold Cup stadiums
Downtown Cleveland